James J. Hardy was an African-American member of the South Carolina legislature from 1870 to 1871.

His son Walter S. E. Hardy became a doctor. He applied to the University of Tennessee in 1939. Dr. Walter Hardy Memorial Park and the Dr. Walter S. E. Hardy Scholarship are named for him.

References

Year of birth missing
Year of death missing
African-American state legislators in South Carolina
Members of the South Carolina General Assembly
19th-century American politicians